The 2022 Budapest Open was a professional tennis tournament played on outdoor clay courts. It was the fourth edition of the tournament and first as a WTA 125 which is also part of the 2022 WTA 125 tournaments, offering a total of $115,000 in prize money. It took place at the Római Teniszakadémia in Budapest, Hungary between 19 and 24 September 2022.

Champions

Singles

  Tamara Korpatsch def.  Viktoriya Tomova 7–6(7–3), 6–7(4–7), 6–0

Doubles

  Anna Bondár /  Kimberley Zimmermann def.  Jesika Malečková /  Renata Voráčová 6–3, 2–6, [10–5]

Singles entrants

Seeds 

 1 Rankings are as of 12 September 2022.

Other entrants 
The following players received a wildcard into the singles main draw:
  Tímea Babos
  Irina-Camelia Begu
  Fanny Stollár
  Rebeka Stolmár
  Natália Szabanin

The following players received entry with a special exempt:
  Réka Luca Jani

The following players qualified into the singles main draw:
  Carolina Alves
  Tamara Korpatsch
  Jesika Malečková
  Emma Navarro

The following player received entry as a lucky loser:
  Erika Andreeva

Withdrawals 
Before the tournament
  Irina-Camelia Begu → replaced by  Erika Andreeva
  Ana Bogdan → replaced by  Simona Waltert
  Viktorija Golubic → replaced by  Jule Niemeier
  Kaja Juvan → replaced by  Julia Grabher
  Harmony Tan → replaced by  Irina Bara 
  Clara Tauson → replaced by  Harmony Tan
  Maryna Zanevska → replaced by  Cristina Bucșa

Doubles entrants

Seeds 

 1 Rankings as of 12 September 2022.

Other entrants 
The following pair received a wildcard into the doubles main draw:
  Kitti Molnár /  Viktória Varga

References 

2022 WTA 125 tournaments
Tennis tournaments in Hungary
2022 in Hungarian sport
September 2022 sports events in Hungary